Heritage Pointe is a hamlet located in Alberta, Canada within Foothills County. It is located north of Dunbow Road, between Highway 2 (Deerfoot Trail) and Highway 2A (MacLeod Trail), adjacent to the southern boundary of Calgary.

Demographics 

In the 2016 Census of Population conducted by Statistics Canada, Heritage Pointe recorded a population of 2,075 living in 710 of its 721 total private dwellings, a  change from its 2011 population of 2,041.

See also 
List of communities in Alberta
List of hamlets in Alberta

References 

Hamlets in Alberta
Foothills County